Events from the year 1197 in Ireland.

Incumbent
Lord: John

Deaths
Ruadhri Ua Flaithbertaigh, King of Iar Connacht

References

 
1190s in Ireland
Ireland
Years of the 12th century in Ireland